Go Riteway Transportation Group is a motor coach, limo coach, black car, commuter coach, and school bus service provider based in Oak Creek, Wisconsin. Go Riteway Transportation Group, founded in 1957, is now in its third generation of family management.

Go Riteway school bus division was started in 1957, by Rollie and Pearl Bast, with four school buses serving the Germantown School District. GO Riteway's 1,600 employees operate out of over 25 locations across the Midwest with a fleet of 1,300 vehicles that includes school buses, motor coaches, shuttle coaches, limo coaches, executive sedans and vans.

In July 2011 the company changed its name from Riteway Bus Service to Go Riteway Transportation Group.

Go Riteway offers daily commuter shuttle service to and from Milwaukee, West Bend, Richfield, and Germantown, Wisconsin as the Washington County Commuter Express (WCCE).

It also operates charter services in Wisconsin and Illinois.

References

External links
 

Bus transportation in Wisconsin
Transportation in Washington County, Wisconsin